David Realista Grachat (born 21 January 1987) is a Portuguese para-swimmer, competing in S9 classification events. He has competed at three Summer Paralympic Games, 2008 in Beijing, 2012 in London and  2016 in Rio. Grachat has won medals at both European and World level, and specializes in the 400m freestyle.

Personal history
Grachat was born in Lisbon, Portugal in 1987. He was born without a left hand.

Swimming career
Grachat took up swimming as a youth as his parents wanted him to improve his health. He was classified as a S9 swimmer and made his international debut for Portugal in 2005. Grachat made his Paralympic debut at the 2008 Games in Beijing competing in the 50 m and 100 m freestyle S9 events and the 200 m individual medley (SM9). In the 50 m he failed to qualify for the finals finishing fourth in his heat. He performed better in the other events reaching the finals of both. He finished 6th in the 200m and 7th in the individual medley.

In 2012 Grachat was selected for his second Paralympic Games, held in London. He entered four events, 50 m, 100 m and 400 m freestyle S9 races and the SM9 200m individual medley. He progressed through only one of the heats, the 400m freestyle, setting a national record of 4:24.10 to finish third in his race. At the final he bettered his own national record with a time of 4:21.94, but this was only good enough for a sixth-place finish.

Grachat's first international success came in his favoured 400 m freestyle at the 2014 IPC Swimming European Championships in Eindhoven. There he posted a time of 4.26.61 to win the bronze medal. He bettered this the following year at the 2015 IPC Swimming World Championships in Glasgow where he won his first World Championship medal with a bronze in the Men's 400 metre freestyle. In the buildup to the 2016 Summer Paralympics in Rio, Grachat competed at the 2016 IPC Swimming European Championships, held on home soil in Funchal. He again claimed a third place spot to take his second career European bronze.

References

External links
 David Grachet at the International Paralympic Committee

1987 births
Living people
Portuguese male freestyle swimmers
Paralympic swimmers of Portugal
Swimmers at the 2008 Summer Paralympics
Swimmers at the 2012 Summer Paralympics
Swimmers from Lisbon
S9-classified Paralympic swimmers
Medalists at the World Para Swimming Championships
Medalists at the World Para Swimming European Championships
Swimmers at the 2020 Summer Paralympics
20th-century Portuguese people
21st-century Portuguese people